John Pickens Curtiss (born April 5, 1993) is an American professional baseball pitcher for the New York Mets of Major League Baseball (MLB). He previously played in MLB for the Minnesota Twins, Los Angeles Angels, Tampa Bay Rays, Miami Marlins, and Milwaukee Brewers.

Career
Curtiss attended Carroll Senior High School in Southlake, Texas. He was drafted by the Colorado Rockies in the 30th round of the 2011 Major League Baseball Draft. He did not sign with the Rockies and attended the University of Texas at Austin and played college baseball for the Texas Longhorns. Curtiss was then drafted by the Minnesota Twins in the sixth round of the 2014 MLB Draft.

Minnesota Twins
Curtiss made his professional debut with the Elizabethton Twins. He played 2015 with the Gulf Coast Twins and Cedar Rapids Kernels and 2016 with Cedar Rapids and Fort Myers Miracle. After the 2016 season, he played in the Arizona Fall League. Curtiss started 2017 with the Chattanooga Lookouts and was promoted to the Rochester Red Wings. He was called up to the major leagues for the first time on August 23, 2017.

Los Angeles Angels
After being designated for assignment, Curtiss was traded to the Los Angeles Angels in exchange for Daniel Ozoria on January 15, 2019. He opened the 2019 season with the Salt Lake Bees. He appeared in one game for the Angels on April 15. On April 30, he was designated for assignment. He was outrighted on May 3, but refused the assignment in favor of free agency.

Philadelphia Phillies
On June 12, 2019, Curtiss signed a minor league deal with the Philadelphia Phillies. He was released on July 7, 2019.

Tampa Bay Rays
On February 3, 2020, Curtiss signed a minor league contract with the Tampa Bay Rays. He was called up on August 9, 2020, after Oliver Drake was placed on the injured list, and made his debut that day, pitching two perfect innings in a 4–3 victory over the New York Yankees. Curtiss earned his first major league win on August 11 in an 8–2 victory over the Boston Red Sox. Curtiss was the winning pitcher in Game 4 of the 2020 World Series, in which the Rays walked off the Los Angeles Dodgers 8–7 in a finish labelled as an "instant classic". However, the Rays would go on to lose the World Series four games to two.

Miami Marlins
On February 17, 2021, Curtiss was traded to the Miami Marlins in exchange for Evan Edwards.

Milwaukee Brewers
On July 30, 2021, Curtiss was traded to the Milwaukee Brewers in exchange for Payton Henry. On August 11, Curtiss was placed on the injured list after suffering a torn ulnar collateral ligament in his right elbow, ending his season. On September 7, Curtiss underwent Tommy John surgery. On November 30, Curtiss was non-tendered by the Brewers, making him a free agent.

New York Mets
On April 6, 2022, Curtiss signed a major league contract with the New York Mets. Because of his injury from the year prior, Curtiss missed the entirety of the 2022 season. He is back for the 2023 season.

References

External links

Texas Longhorns bio

1993 births
Living people
Baseball players from Dallas
Major League Baseball pitchers
Minnesota Twins players
Los Angeles Angels players
Tampa Bay Rays players
Miami Marlins players
Milwaukee Brewers players
Texas Longhorns baseball players
Elizabethton Twins players
Gulf Coast Twins players
Cedar Rapids Kernels players
Fort Myers Miracle players
Surprise Saguaros players
Chattanooga Lookouts players
Rochester Red Wings players
Salt Lake Bees players